Studdard is a surname. Notable people with the surname include:

Dave Studdard, former tackle in the National Football League for the Denver Broncos
Kasey Studdard (born 1984), American football player for the Houston Texans of the National Football League
Ruben Studdard (born 1978), American pop, R&B, and gospel singer